Thierry Lutonda (born 27 October 2000) is a Belgian professional footballer who plays as a left-back for Eredivisie side RKC Waalwijk.

Club career
Lutonda prolonged his stay with Anderlecht in March 2019 for three years. He made his professional debut for Anderlecht in a 2–1 Belgian First Division A defeat against Oostende on 28 July 2019. He joined RKC Waalwijk on a season-long loan in July 2020. 

At the end of the 2020–21 season, RKC Waalwijk avoided relegation, and that triggered a clause in the loan contract to make transfer permanent, with the new contract until 2024.

Personal life
Born in Belgium, Lutonda is of Congolese descent.

References

External links
 
 

Living people
2000 births
Belgian people of Democratic Republic of the Congo descent
Belgian footballers
Footballers from Liège
Belgium youth international footballers
Association football defenders
Belgian Pro League players
Eredivisie players
R.S.C. Anderlecht players
RKC Waalwijk players
Belgian expatriate footballers
Belgian expatriate sportspeople in the Netherlands
Expatriate footballers in the Netherlands